Coldharbour Halt railway station was a small station from 1929 to 1963 on the Culm Valley Light Railway.

History 
The station was opened on 23 February 1929 by the Great Western Railway. It was situated on the west side of Coldharbour. It was known as Cold Harbour Halt in the handbook of stations until 1956. It had a siding behind the platform and a signal box at the south end of the platform. This controlled the siding and the level crossing. The station closed on 9 September 1963.

References 

Former Great Western Railway stations
Railway stations in Great Britain opened in 1929
Railway stations in Great Britain closed in 1963
1929 establishments in England
1963 disestablishments in England